The Nizamabad Urban Development Authority is an urban planning agency in Nizamabad district of the Indian state of Telangana. It was set up on 10 May 2017 by the Telangana state government and has its headquarters at Nizamabad.

The urban development agency with a geographical area of  spreading across Nizamabad North, South and Rural mandals of the city sees over the infrastructure development and planning for 3,14,035 urban and 3,22,781 rural residents, tallying the overall population to about 6,33,933 under the urban agglomeration.

Bounds 
Telangana Municipal Administration Minister K Taraka Rama Rao released GO MS No 271 setting up Nizamabad Urban Development Authority (NUDA) to merge Nizamabad Municipal Corporation and surrounding 72 gram panchayats & villages situated in six mandals of Nizamabad district.

References 
https://www.ntnews.com/telangana-news/prabhakar-reddy-chairman-of-nizamabad-urban-development-authority-1-1-576928.html

Nizamabad district
Urban development authorities of Telangana